Daphnella botanica, common names the botanic turrid and Botany Bay turrid, is a species of sea snail, a marine gastropod mollusk in the family Raphitomidae.

Description
The length of the shell attains 26 mm, its diameter 7 mm.

(Original description) The shell is ovate, ventricose, thin, fragile and transparent. The body whorl is very much the largest. The shell is very closely reticulated throughout with fine raised lines, of which the transverse are the stronger. The aperture is large and sinuated. The base and the columella are truncated. The color of the shell is transparent white.

(Renamed by Hedley) The shell is slender-fusiform, slightly contracted at the base. The spire is produced.

Colour: On a buff ground the whole surface is irregularly clouded or  mottled with burnt umber, the dark spaces often predominating.

The shell contains six whorls, plus the protoconch, rounded, wound obliquely, excavated at the
fasciole, and angled below it.

Sculpture: The protoconch consists of 2½ whorls and is microscopically obliquely reticulated. The body whorl has about forty spiral threads, the penultimate twelve, and so on till the topmost with three is reached. Between the larger threads smaller ones are intercalated, and gradually enlarge till of equal size. The small sharp radials, close set at the rate of about eighty to a whorl, override the spirals and produce beads at the points of intersection. These extend unbroken across the whole shell. The aperture is oblique elliptical, half the length of the shell. The outer lip is thin and arched forward. The notch is deep and broad. The inner lip excavates the sculpture of raised network in its path of advancement. The columella shows a thin callus deposit.

Distribution
This marine species is endemic to Australia and occurs off New South Wales, Tasmania and Western Australia.

References

  Hedley, C. 1918. A checklist of the marine fauna of New South Wales. Part 1. Journal and Proceedings of the Royal Society of New South Wales 51: M1–M120
 Hedley, C. 1922. A revision of the Australian Turridae. Records of the Australian Museum 13(6): 213–359, pls 42–56
 Allan, J.K. 1950. Australian shells: with related animals living in the sea, in freshwater and on the land. Melbourne : Georgian House xix, 470 pp., 
 Laseron, C. 1954. Revision of the New South Wales Turridae (Mollusca). Australian Zoological Handbook. Sydney : Royal Zoological Society of New South Wales pp. 56, pls 1–12.
 Powell, A.W.B. 1968. The turrid shellfish of Australian waters. Australian Natural History 1 16: 1–6 
 Kilburn, R.N. (1977) Taxonomic studies on the marine Mollusca of southern Africa and Mozambique. Part 1. Annals of the Natal Museum, 23, 173–214.
 Coleman, N. 1975. What Shell is That? Sydney : Lansdowne Press 298 pp.
 Wilson, B. 1994. Australian marine shells. Prosobranch gastropods. Kallaroo, WA : Odyssey Publishing Vol. 2 370 pp.

External links
 
 Gastropods.com: Daphnella boholensis
 Beechey, D. 2004. Daphnella botanica Hedley, 1918.

botanica
Gastropods described in 1922
Gastropods of Australia